Albrook Air Force Station is a former United States Air Force facility in Panama. It was closed on 30 September 1997 as a result of the Torrijos-Carter Treaties which specified that United States military facilities in the former Panama Canal Zone be closed and the facilities be turned over to the Panamanian government. It was located on the east side of the Panama Canal just south of Fort Clayton and north of the township of Balboa, Panama. Beginning in January 1999, the air field initiated civilian air service as Albrook "Marcos A. Gelabert" International Airport.

Major commands to which assigned
 Panama Canal Department, 1932- 19 October 1940
 Panama Canal Air Force, 19 October 1940 - 5 August 1941
 Caribbean Air Force, 5 August 1941 - 18 September 1942
 Sixth Air Force, 18 September 1942 - 31 July 1946
 Caribbean Air Command, 31 July 1946 - 8 July 1963
 United States Air Forces Southern Command, 8 July 1963 - 1 January 1976
 Tactical Air Command
 USAF Southern Air Division, 1 January 1976 - 1 January 1989
 830th Air Division, 1 January 1989 - 15 February 1991
 Air Forces Panama, 15 February 1991 - 11 February 1992
 Tactical Air Command, 11 February - 31 May 1992
 Air Combat Command, 31 May 1992 - 30 September 1997

Major units assigned

 16th Pursuit (later Fighter) Group
 24th Pursuit (later Fighter) Squadron, 26 October 1932-10 January 1943; 28 May-9 June 1943
 28th Pursuit Squadron, 1 February-5 October 1940
 29th Pursuit (later Fighter) Squadron, 1 October 1933-17 May 1942
 43d Pursuit (later Fighter) Squadron, 1 February 1940-13 July 1942
 73d Pursuit Squadron, 1 October 1933-14 July 1941
 78th Pursuit Squadron, 15 October 1932-1 September 1937
 19th Composite Wing, 25 January 1933
 Redesignated 19th Wing, 1937
 Redesignated 19th Bombardment Wing, 1940 - 25 October 1941
 37th Pursuit (later Fighter) Group
 30th Pursuit Squadron, 13 November 1940-24 November 1941
 31st Pursuit (later Fighter) Squadron, 13 November 1940-9 November 1941; 31 December 1941-3 February 1942; 19 May-30 September 1942
 Headquarters, Panama Canal Air Force, 20 November 1940
 Redesignated: Caribbean Air Force. August 5, 1941
 Redesignated: 6th Air Force, September 18, 1942
 Redesignated: Caribbean Air Command, July 31, 1946
 Redesignated: United States Air Forces Southern Command July 8, 1963-1 January 1976

 12 Pursuit Wing, 10 November 1940 – 6 March 1942
 32d Pursuit (later Fighter) Group
 51st Pursuit Squadron, 1 January-21 August 1941
 52d Pursuit Squadron, 1 January-21 August 1941
 53d Pursuit Squadron, 1 January-21 August 1941
 VI Bomber Command, 25 October 1941 – 1 November 1946
 XXVI Fighter Command, 6 March 1942 - 25 August 1946
 1st Communications Squadron, Air Support, 23 April 1942-April 1943
 40th Bombardment Group, 16 September 1942 - 3 June 1943
 6th Bombardment Group, 14 January - 1 November 1943
 3rd Bombardment Squadron
 74th Bombardment Squadron
 Sixth Air Force Base Command
 20th Troop Carrier Squadron, 9 June 1943-September 1948
 1st Depot Repair Squadron, 6 May 1943 – 7 December 1944
 314th Troop Carrier Group, 1 October 1946 - 10 March 1948
 5700th Composite Wing
 18th Troop Carrier Squadron, 1 August 1948-1 March 1949
 24th Composite Wing, 8 November 1967 - 3 January 1968
 830th Air Division, 1 January 1976 – 15 August 1977; 1 March 1989 – 15 February 1991

Post USAF use
In September 1997, the base was turned over to Panama. It was then refurbished with an operations / control tower constructed; also a passenger terminal (near Building 446, the hangar that previously housed the former Air Force Post Office).  In January 1999, the domestic/commercial Albrook "Marcos A. Gelabert" International Airport was relocated to Albrook from Punta Paitilla (across Panama City). Airport is under Panama's Civil Aeronautics Authority (Autoridad de Aeronáutica Civil —previously named Civil Aviation Directorate). 

A number of shops, markets, mall and government agencies (Panamanian Red Cross, International Maritime University of Panama) operate out of some of the old buildings and hangars, and most of the officers quarters are now private homes.

The Civil Aviation Authority has its headquarters in Building 805.

Notes

References

External links
Historic American Buildings Survey (HABS) documentation, filed under Balboa, Former Panama Canal Zone, CZ:

1932 establishments in Panama
1997 disestablishments in Panama
Airports in Panama
Buildings and structures in Panamá Province
Historic American Buildings Survey in the former Panama Canal Zone
Installations of the United States Air Force in Panama
Military installations closed in 1997
Panama Canal Zone